The Danish handball league system, also known as the handball league pyramid, refers to the hierarchically interconnected league structure for handball in Denmark, in which all divisions are bound together by the principle of promotion and relegation. Within men's handball, the top two professional levels contain one division each. Below this, the semi-professional and amateur levels have progressively more parallel divisions, which each cover progressively smaller geographic areas. The top four tiers are classed as nationwide, while the fifth tier and below are classed provincial leagues. Teams that finish at the top of their division at the end of each season can rise higher in the pyramid, while those that finish at the bottom find themselves sinking further down. In theory it is possible for even the lowest local amateur club to rise to the top of the system and become Danish handball champions one day. The number of teams promoted and relegated between the divisions varies, and promotion to the upper levels of the pyramid is usually contingent on meeting additional criteria, especially concerning appropriate facilities and finances.

The league system is held under the jurisdiction of the Danish HA (DHF) and its three regional associations. Dansk Arbejder Idrætsforbund (DAI) run a separate league system for their members. . The pyramid for women's football in Denmark runs separately with fewer divisions and levels. The women's top-flight league is semi-professional and additional criteria apply, the higher the team is placed in the league system.

Current structure

Men's league system
The Danish football league system is held under the jurisdiction of the national Danish Football Association (DBU) and its professional body Divisionsforeningen (DF), along with its six regional associations. On top of the hierarchical system sit the level one Superliga, the level two 1. division and the level three 2. division, collectively known as the Danmarksturneringen i fodbold (Herre-DM) and referred to as divisionerne, organised by the Divisionsforeningen. The top-flight league is professional, while the second-tier league consists primarily of professional and semi-professional teams, with the third-tier being a semi-professional league consisting of primarily semi-professional and amateur teams with some professional teams. The three top levels then are followed by the level four Danmarksserien (Herre-DS), the lowest league classed as nationwide and the highest fully amateur league, operated by the Danish FA itself. The fourth level and below are collectively referred to as serierne (roughly translated into non-league). At the fifth level, four parallel regional leagues are operated by four regional football associations, some of which have multiple divisions. The regional associations are divided by geographical boundaries.

References

Handball in Denmark
Handball competitions in Denmark
Professional sports leagues in Denmark